Emerald Energy plc is an energy exploration subsidiary of Chinese state-owned company Sinochem with headquarters in London but is registered offshore in the Isle of Man. The company specialises in oil exploration and production of hydrocarbons. Formerly listed on the London Stock Exchange and a constituent of the FTSE 250 Index, the firm was acquired by Sinochem Group in October 2009. The phone number for any ex-shareholder questions is 020 7930 7060.

History 
The company was established in 1996 when it was first listed on the London Stock Exchange as an oil exploration business. Later in 1996 it secured its first major opportunity at the Matambo field in Colombia. By 1998 it had started drilling at Gigante in the Matambo field.

In May 2000 a serious fire at Gigante put a well out of production for several months.

The company extended its activities to Campo Rico in Colombia in 2002 and to Fortuna in Colombia in 2003. In 2003 it also started activities in Syria, its first move outside Colombia, and replaced the Board and senior management.

Buyout 
On 13 July 2009 the company announced that it was in preliminary takeover talks with a third party. On 12 August Sinochem Resources UK Limited, an indirect wholly owned subsidiary of Sinochem Corporation, announced their recommended proposals for the all-cash acquisition of Emerald Energy Plc. It is proposed that 750 pence will be paid in cash for each share, valuing Emerald Energy at approximately £532.1 million.

On 2 October Emerald Energy announced the results of an EGM, where a clear majority of 99% of shareholders voted to approve the sale's scheme of arrangement. The last day of dealings in, and for registration of transfers of the company's shares was 6 October 2009. The shares were removed from the LSE on 12 October, and the company became a subsidiary of Sinochem the next day.

Operations 
Emerald Energy have many contracts which cover exploration and exploitation rights of oil fields in Colombia and Syria. Since the takeover by Sinochem details of operations have been removed from the official website. Below are details of some operations from before the Sinochem buyout.

In March 2023 there were violent protests at its facilities near San Vicente del Caguan in Colombia.

Colombia 
 Matambo Association Contract, Gigante field
 At 69 km² it covers the Gigante field and surrounding areas in the Upper Magdalena Valley.
 Campo Rico Association Contract, Campo Rico & Vigia Fields
 At 503 km² it covers the Llanos basin area.
 Fortuna Association Contract
 At 106 km² it covers the oil-producing Middle Magdalena Valley basin and includes the Totumal oil field. Emerald have a 90% working interest in the area.
 Maranta E&P Contract
 At 365 km² it covers the area northeast of the producing oil fields in the Putumayo Basin (southwest Colombia).
 Ombu E&P Contract
 At 300 km² it covers the Caguan Basin, to the south-west of the Llanos Basin.
 Helen E&P Contract
At 213 km² it covers the Putumayo Basin in south-west Colombia. Emerald are a co-venturer to jointly explore the area.
 Jacaranda E&P Contract
 At 235 km² it covers the Llanos Basin, 130 km southwest of the Campo Rico operations.

Syria 
 Block 26
 Through Emerald Energy's wholly owned subsidiary, SNG Overseas Ltd, they have a 50% working interest in Block 26, the other 50% is held by Gulfsands Petroleum Syria Ltd. It is located in northeast Syria and covers around 11,000 km².

References

External links 
 Official site

Oil and gas companies of the United Kingdom
2009 mergers and acquisitions
Companies based in the City of Westminster
Energy companies established in 1996
Non-renewable resource companies established in 1996
1996 establishments in England
Companies formerly listed on the London Stock Exchange
British subsidiaries of foreign companies